Theodore Jantjies is a South African actor best known for his starring role as Xander Meintjies in the SABC2 soap opera 7de Laan.

Biography

Early life 
Theodore was born in Heidelberg in the Western Cape. In 2002 he matriculated from Kairos Secondary School and went on to study theatre at Northlink College in Cape Town. In 2004 he completed his diploma in Performing Arts.

He started his professional career in theatre in 2005, as one of the leading characters in Die Keiser, to critical acclaim and was nominated for an award for his portrayal. After that followed Kanna hy ko Huistoe at the Baxter Theatre in Cape Town and many others.

Career 
He made his television debut in the e.tv sitcom Madam and Eve, which was followed by the e.tv primetime soap, Scandal!.
He then starred in the Henry Mylne production of Die Swerfjare van Poppie Nongena, opposite veteran actress Vinette Ebrahim. The production was hailed as one of the top productions at Arts festivals, KKNK and the Suidooster fees.

Since 2008, he was working on the SABC2 soap 7de Laan, in which he plays the role of Xander Meintjies. In 2020 he left the show.

Filmography 
 7de Laan as Xander Meintjies

External links
 7de Laan official website

1983 births
Living people
Cape Coloureds
South African male actors
South African people of Dutch descent
South African male soap opera actors